Euseius orygmus is a species of mite in the family Phytoseiidae.

References

orygmus
Articles created by Qbugbot
Animals described in 1988